Alsophila lunulata refers to one of two species of tree ferns:

 Alsophila lunulata (G.Forst.) R.Br., synonym of Sphaeropteris lunulata (G.Forst.) R.M.Tryon
 Alsophila lunulata Blume, synonym of Alsophila junghuhniana Kunze